The Seminole County Fire Department (SCFD) provides fire protection and emergency medical services to the unincorporated parts of Seminole County, Florida along with the cities of Altamonte Springs, Casselberry, and Winter Springs.

History
The Seminole County Department of Public Safety first created an EMS/Fire/Rescue Division in 1974. This department, which was created from numerous volunteer departments that were already established across the county, was designed to serve the unincorporated areas of Seminole County. By 2000 the department had grown to over 13 stations and in 2002 merged with the City of Altamonte Springs' Fire Department to make one of the largest fire departments in Central Florida. In October 2008, Winter Springs Fire Department also merged into Seminole County bringing the number of county stations to 18. On October 1, 2015 Casselberry Fire/Rescue was assimilated into Seminole County.

Stations and Apparatus
The SCFD has 20 stations spread out in 4 separate battalions. Due to the first response structure of SCFD, a city BC or apparatus may respond as first in to a call. The first response structure was slightly altered in September 2019 with the introduction of a new GPS based AVL and CAD system allowing for the physically closest available unit to the incident to respond automatically.  Station 65 at the University of Central Florida is jointly run by the Orange County Fire Rescue.

References

County government agencies in Florida
Fire departments in Florida
Fire Department